Richard Driver (junior) (16 September 1829 – 8 July 1880) was a Sydney solicitor, politician and cricket administrator.

Driver was born in Cabramatta, New South Wales, son of Richard Driver, hotel-keeper, and his wife Elizabeth, née Powell. In 1859, he became a solicitor for the Sydney City Council and also carried out a practice in the Sydney police court.

Driver unsuccessfully contested three seats in the New South Wales Legislative Assembly in 1858 and was defeated again for East Sydney in 1859, but won West Macquarie in 1860 and held it to 1869. He was the member for Carcoar from 1869 to 1872 and Windsor from 1872 to his death in 1880. He generally supported Henry Parkes, but turned down an offer of to be made minister of mines in 1872. He became Secretary for Lands in Parkes' 1877 government and as a cricket lover he provided £700 for improvements to the Sydney Cricket Ground and vested the ground in trustees in 1879, including himself as the representative of the New South Wales Cricket Association.

Driver played in New South Wales' first first-class cricket match against Victoria in Melbourne in 1856. He travelled with the team as the scorer, but when one of the selected team failed to turn up, he played instead. Batting at No. 11, he made 18 in the first innings, helping to take the score from 9 for 40 to 76 all out. New South Wales won narrowly, and Driver was the match's equal highest scorer. It was his only match for New South Wales. He umpired four of New South Wales' first-class matches between 1857 and 1877. From 1860 to 1880 he was an important organiser of visits by English cricket teams and intercolonial matches. He was president of the New South Wales Cricket Association from 1870 to 1880. 

In 1871 Driver married Elizabeth Margaret Marlow. He died in the Sydney suburb of Randwick and is buried at Waverley Cemetery. A road built in the 1890s outside the Sydney Cricket Ground is named Driver Avenue in his honour.

See also

Sydney Riot of 1879
List of New South Wales representative cricketers

References

1829 births
1880 deaths
Members of the New South Wales Legislative Assembly
Burials at Waverley Cemetery
19th-century Australian politicians
Australian cricketers
New South Wales cricketers
Pre-Federation Australian cricket administrators